Raymond Herbert Talbot (August 19, 1896 – January 30, 1955) was an American politician who served as the 27th Governor of Colorado for eleven days in 1937.

Talbot, an electrical engineer, was elected to the Colorado House of Representatives in 1926 and to the Colorado Senate in 1928.  In 1932, he was elected the 26th lieutenant governor as the running mate of Edwin C. Johnson.  Johnson resigned as governor on January 1, 1937, eleven days before the expiration of his term, to take his seat in the United States Senate.  Talbot was sworn in as governor to fill the eleven-day interim until the start of the term of newly elected Governor Teller Ammons.

After his brief term as governor, Talbot served as a city commissioner and postmaster of Pueblo, Colorado, and continued in office as president of the Colorado State Fair Commission (1931–53).

External links
 State of Colorado biography
 

1896 births
1955 deaths
Democratic Party members of the Colorado House of Representatives
Democratic Party Colorado state senators
Lieutenant Governors of Colorado
Democratic Party governors of Colorado
Politicians from Chicago
20th-century American politicians